Tanners Creek is a stream in the U.S. state of Indiana.

Tanners Creek was named after John Tanner Jr., a pioneer settler who was captured by Indians.

The Tanner's Creek Generating Station operated on the banks of Tanners Creek until it closed in 2015.

References

Rivers of Indiana
Rivers of Dearborn County, Indiana
Tributaries of the Ohio River